Navid or Navid-e Elm-o San'at ("Promise of Science and Technology") was an experimental Iranian Earth observation satellite. The satellite carried a camera for taking higher resolution imagery of Earth and it was also be used to collect weather data and monitor natural disasters. The third satellite to be launched indigenously by Iran, it was placed into orbit by a new configuration of the Safir carrier rocket, featuring a larger second stage with 20% more thrust. The launch occurred at approximately 00:04 UTC on 3 February 2012. The satellite remained in orbit for two months, before reentering the atmosphere on 1 April 2012.

See also

Iranian Space Agency

References

External links
Launch video
Real Time NAVID Satellite Tracking
Orbital notes

Spacecraft launched in 2012
Satellites of Iran
Spacecraft which reentered in 2012